Acicula parcelineata is a species of small land snail with an operculum, a terrestrial gastropod mollusc in the family Aciculidae.

Distribution
This species is found in the Czech Republic (in Moravia only), Slovakia, Poland, Romania, Ukraine.

References

Acicula (gastropod)
Gastropods described in 1911